Britta Lejon (born 2 November 1964) is a Swedish Social Democratic politician. She was a member of the Riksdag, and the cabinet of Göran Persson. Lejon is the daughter of former Minister of Justice, Anna-Greta Leijon.

After graduating from gymnasium (secondary school) at Spånga gymnasium in 1983, she studied at the Universities of Stockholm and Lund. Lejon worked for the Department of Transportations during 1987-1990 and worked at the Department of Communication in 1990. She was Minister for Democratic Issues in the Ministry of Justice 1998-2002, when she was succeeded by Mona Sahlin.

References

External links
Britta Lejon at the Riksdag website

1964 births
Living people
Members of the Riksdag from the Social Democrats
Stockholm University alumni
Women members of the Riksdag
Members of the Riksdag 2002–2006
21st-century Swedish women politicians
People from Järfälla Municipality
Women government ministers of Sweden